George Washington Warren (October 1, 1813 – May 13, 1883) was a Massachusetts attorney, jurist, and politician who served as the first mayor of  Charlestown, Massachusetts.

He was born in Watertown, Massachusetts and graduated from Harvard College in 1830 and later from Harvard Law School.  He was an attorney by profession.

In 1838 he served as a representative to the Massachusetts General Court.

He served as the first mayor of Charlestown, Massachusetts from 1847 to 1850.  He was a member of the Whig Party.

From 1853 to 1854 he served as a Massachusetts state senator.

He served as a municipal court judge for Charlestown from 1861 until his death.

In 1867 he joined the Ancient and Honorable Artillery Company of Massachusetts.

He died in Boston, Massachusetts in 1883 at the age of 69.

References
 Amory, Thomas Coffin: Class Memoir of George Washington Warren, with English and American Ancestry (1886).

Notes

Massachusetts state senators
Harvard Law School alumni
Members of the Massachusetts House of Representatives
Mayors of Charlestown, Massachusetts
1813 births
1883 deaths
Massachusetts Whigs
19th-century American politicians
Harvard College alumni